Dipterocarpus cuspidatus is a tree in the family Dipterocarpaceae.

Description
The bark is rust-brown.

Distribution and habitat
Dipterocarpus cuspidatus is endemic to Borneo, where it is recorded from only three sites in Sarawak. Its habitat is mixed dipterocarp forest on low hills up to  elevation.

Conservation
Dipterocarpus cuspidatus has been assessed as Critically endangered on the IUCN Red List. The species is threatened by logging for timber and by the conversion of land for palm oil plantations.

References

cuspidatus
Endemic flora of Borneo
Plants described in 1967
Flora of the Borneo lowland rain forests